Elisabeth von Esseö (28 June 1883 – 17 September 1954) was a German sculptor. Her work was part of the sculpture event in the art competition at the 1928 Summer Olympics.

References

1883 births
1954 deaths
20th-century German sculptors
German women sculptors
Olympic competitors in art competitions
People from Vas County
20th-century German women